Conana or Konana was an inland town of ancient Pisidia inhabited during Hellenistic, Roman, and Byzantine times. The town may also have been called Justinianopolis or Ioustinianoupolis (Ἰουστινιανούπολις). The town was a bishopric in early days of Christianity; no longer the seat of a residential bishop, it remains a titular see of the Roman Catholic Church.

Its site is located near Gönen, in Asiatic Turkey.

References

Populated places in Pisidia
Former populated places in Turkey
Roman towns and cities in Turkey
Catholic titular sees in Asia
Populated places of the Byzantine Empire
History of Isparta Province